Sysertsky (masculine), Sysertskaya (feminine), or Sysertskoye (neuter) may refer to:
Sysertsky District, a district of Sverdlovsk Oblast, Russia
Sysertsky Urban Okrug, a municipal formation in Sverdlovsk Oblast, Russia, which the town of Sysert is incorporated as